Khorma (also Romanized as Khormā) is a village in Otaqvar Rural District, Otaqvar District, Langarud County, Gilan Province, Iran. At the 2006 census, its population was 92, in 33 families.

References 

Populated places in Langarud County